Bretislav is a Czech masculine given name. It may refer to:

Bretislav I (1005–1055), Duke of Bohemia
Bretislav II (1060–1100), Duke of Bohemia
Bretislav III (d. 1197), Duke of Bohemia
Břetislav Dolejší (1928–2010), Czechoslovak footballer
Břetislav Bakala (1897–1958), Czech conductor, pianist, and composer 
Břetislav Pojar (1923–2012), puppeteer, animator and film director
Břetislav Hůla (1888–1937), Comintern
Břetislav Rychlík (born 1958), Czech actor
Břetislav Benda (1897–1983), Czech sculptor
 (born 1959), philosopher and religious scholar
Břetislav Bartoš (1893–1926), Czech painter

See also
 Bratislav, a masculine given name

Czech masculine given names